"Last Thing on My Mind" is the third and final single released from Irish singer-songwriter Ronan Keating's third studio album, Turn It On (2003). It was also included on LeAnn Rimes' Greatest Hits album as well as her Best of album. The song was released on 3 May 2004, peaking at number five on the UK Singles Chart. In the United States, the music video received heavy rotation on the VH1 Country channel and became an adult contemporary hit, reaching number 16 on the Billboard Adult Contemporary chart. Elsewhere, the song reached the top 40 in Austria, Denmark, and Ireland.

Track listings
UK CD single
 "Last Thing on My Mind" – 3:56
 "Last Thing on My Mind" (Metro mix) – 3:37
 "Last Thing on My Mind" (Mo Monkey mix) – 4:43
 "Last Thing on My Mind" (video)

European CD single
 "Last Thing on My Mind" (single version) – 3:56
 "Last Thing on My Mind" (Metro mix) – 3:37

Charts

Release history

References

2003 songs
2004 singles
Curb Records singles
LeAnn Rimes songs
Polydor Records singles
Ronan Keating songs
Song recordings produced by Steve Robson
Songs written by Ronan Keating
Songs written by Steve Robson